WWSL (102.3 FM) is a radio station broadcasting a hot adult contemporary music format. Licensed to Philadelphia, Mississippi, United States, the station is currently owned by H & G C.

References

External links

WSL